In show business, a guest appearance is the participation of an outsider performer (such as a musician or actor) in an event such as a music record or concert, show, etc., when the performer does not belong to the regular band, cast, or other performing group. In music, such an outside performer is often referred to as a guest artist. In performance art, the terms guest role or guest star are also common, the latter term specifically indicating the guest appearance of a celebrity. The latter is often also credited as special guest star or special musical guest star by some production companies.

In pop music and hip-hop, such guests are often referred to as featured artists or featured guests. Such a performer may be annotated in credits or even in song titles by the abbreviation feat. or further abbreviation ft.; or by the word with or abbreviation w/.

In a TV series, a guest star is an actor who appears in one or a few episodes (sometimes a story arc). In some cases a guest star may play an important recurring character and may appear many times in a series, despite not being a member of the main cast; they may ultimately be asked to join the main cast if their role continues.  The title special guest star is typically used in television for a celebrity guest, but it is also occasionally used for a regular cast member—-usually for an actor or actress who is featured heavily but joined the show after the rest of the cast was signed. The first regular cast member in a TV series to be credited as special guest star was Jonathan Harris in Lost in Space.

The specific credit and billing given to a given performer—"starring," "guest star," "special guest star," "also starring," etc.—is a matter negotiated between the production and the performer or their agent. 

In nonfiction radio and television shows, a guest star is a guest on the show who is a celebrity or other noteworthy interviewee or commentator.

Classical performance arts 
Guest appearances have been known in theatre, ballet, and classical music for centuries, with guests both from the home country and from abroad. The advent of air transport has made this practice much more practical and global.

In classical music, guest orchestra conductors are a common practice.

Guest artists should not be confused with touring groups, troupes, orchestra, or even individual artists, although the distinction may be blurred. In the case of touring, their act is independent in itself, while the guest takes part in the act of the resident staff.

The duration of involvement of a guest artist may vary, from separate short-term acts with fees per concert to fixed temporary contracts for several seasons.

Contemporary music 

In the early days of the pop music industry the bands were relatively stable units, and while guests were not uncommon, they were seldom given credits on album covers. For example, Eric Clapton was not credited in print for his guitar performance in the release of "While My Guitar Gently Weeps" of the Beatles. Gradually guest appearances have become a fully credited staple of music industry. The custom of guest appearance has become especially prominent in rap music, and this influenced rock musicians as well.

To have a guest star on a record, a production coordinator must in many cases obtain permission from the record label of the guest and make sure that proper credits are delivered to the host record label. Often credits appear in the form "Artist name,  courtesy of Record Label name."

Reasons for guest appearances 
A common reason for guest appearances is to draw attention to an act by including a contemporary celebrity. Vice versa, stars of other generations near the end of their career arcs may choose to perform.

In rap, mutual and multiple guest starring was recognized as a way to diversify the performance.

In theatre and ballet, guest appearances diversify actors' repertory and experience under different choreographers, and give more acting opportunities. Even for established stars prestigious overseas engagements increase their home status. Conversely, a guest star benefits the receiving troupe, bringing new inspiration and technique. Audience would welcome diversity, and theatrical business benefits as well: theatre connoisseurs will come to see the same piece with a new star.

Drawbacks 
Commercialization of guests policy may also have negative consequences. Local theatres may limit the growth opportunities for their performers in favor of guests. Sometimes rehearsal times are inadequate to fully integrate the home and guest styles. Touring increases physical load on an actor. It is also associated with multiple stress factors: from jet lags to close calls due to unanticipated travel delays.

With a television series, the appearance of a special guest star, or depending on an overabundance of guest star appearances to the frustration and demerit of the regular cast of the series, could mark the moment when a series "jumps the shark"; that is, a doomed attempt to reverse a decline in popularity.

See also 
 Cameo appearance
 Guest character
 Guest host

References 

Performing arts
Television terminology
Film and video terminology
Acting
Musical terminology